James Russell Brown was Dean of Edmonton from 1974 to 1981.

He was educated at the University of Saskatchewan and was ordained Deacon in 1959; and Priest in 1960. After a curacies in Edmonton he was Rector at Drayton Valley. He was Rector of Winnipeg from 1966 to 1974.

References

1903 births
University of Saskatchewan alumni
Deans of Edmonton
Canadian Anglican priests
Year of death missing
Place of death missing